Richard Hutson (July 9, 1748 – April 12, 1795) was a Founding Father of the United States and an American lawyer, judge, politician, plantation owner, and  slave owner from Charleston, South Carolina. He was born in June 1747 to Rev. William Hutson and Mary Hutson (nee Woodward). His family moved to Charleston in 1756 when his father was the pastor at the Circular Congregational Church. After having been educated in Charleston as a child, he attended Princeton.

In 1778 and 1779 he represented South Carolina as a delegate to the Continental Congress, where he signed the Articles of Confederation. After the British captured Charleston in 1780, he was held as a prisoner at St. Augustine, Florida, for a time. After he returned home, he served as the eighth lieutenant governor of South Carolina under Governor John Mathews in 1782 and 1783. On September 11, 1783, Hutson was elected the first intendant (mayor) of Charleston. He was re-elected on September 13, 1784, winning against Alexander Gillon by a vote of 387 to 127. After his time as intendant of Charleston, he was one of the first three chancellors of the Court of Equity of South Carolina.

He is buried in a vault at the Independent Congregational (Circular) Churchyard in Charleston.

References

External links

1748 births
1795 deaths
People from Beaufort County, South Carolina
American Revolutionary War prisoners of war held by Great Britain
Continental Congressmen from South Carolina
18th-century American politicians
American slave owners
Signers of the Articles of Confederation
Princeton University alumni
Mayors of Charleston, South Carolina
Founding Fathers of the United States